Karnad is an Indian name that may refer to the following notable people:
Karnad Sadashiva Rao (1881–1937), Indian freedom fighter
Bharat Karnad, Indian national security expert
Girish Karnad (1938–2019), Indian actor, film director and writer
Raghu Karnad, Indian journalist and writer
V.G. Karnad (1925–2020), Indian classical flautist

See also
Rag Boli Karnad, a village in Iran